Usnu Muqu (Quechua usnu altar; a special platform for important celebrations, muqu hill, "usnu hill", also spelled Usno Moqo, Usnomoqo) is an archaeological site in Peru. It is located in the Apurímac Region, Abancay Province, Tamburco District, near the main square of Tamburco.

References 

Archaeological sites in Peru
Archaeological sites in Apurímac Region